SU46 (new symbol 5 630) is the name for a diesel universal purpose locomotive working for Polish PKP. Cegielski has produced 52 machines in years 1974-1977 and 2 modified in 1985.

History
The 302D (class SP47) and 303D type (class SU46) locomotives are heavily improved version of 301Db type (class SP/SU45) diesel locomotive. Both of them has similar shape, but SP47 is a bit longer because of its 2116SSF diesel engine. SU46 uses similar diesel engine as SP/SU45, but traction motors are totally different (this was enforced by usage of 3 kV electrical heating). Construction of SU46 was stopped in 1977, most likely due to communist government decisions. In 1985 additional two units of this class were built (numbers 053 and 054). They are slightly modified version of previous locomotives.

Operation
Order of this locomotive was connected with increasing in 1970s demand on freight and passenger services on non-electrified railway lines. SU46 has a very universal characteristic - it was possible to use them in passenger service and freight.

Today they are used in service on west Polish border (passenger and goods) and in Warmia and Masuria (goods train).
Previous they were used also in passenger service on Hel Peninsula.

See also
Polish locomotives designation

References

External links 
Rail Service
Chabówka Rail Museum

Diesel-electric locomotives of Poland
Standard gauge locomotives of Poland
Co′Co′ locomotives
Railway locomotives introduced in 1974